Joseph Daniello is an American animation director. He directed several episodes of the television series American Dad!. Daniello has also worked as a storyboard artist for multiple animated television shows, including Invader Zim, The Fairly OddParents, ChalkZone and CatDog.

Daniello's name appears on a 'Jack Daniel's-like' liquor bottle in American Dad! S07E08 and again in S08E08.

References

External links

American television directors
American animated film directors
Living people
Year of birth missing (living people)
American storyboard artists